Wall of Goth is an EP by Mexican rock band Rey Pila, released on April 28, 2017 via Cult Records.

Track listing

Credits
 Julian Casablancas – producer
 Diego Solórzano – producer
 Shawn Everett – producer
 Chris Tabron – mixer
 Dave Kutch – mastering
 Liz Hirsch – artwork

References

2017 debut EPs
Cult Records EPs
Rey Pila albums